Khaki is a color.

Khaki may also refer to:

Locations
Khaki, East Azerbaijan
Khaki, Lorestan
Khaki Branazar
Khaki-ye Olya (disambiguation), various places
Khaki-ye Shekarabad
Khaki-ye Sofla
Khaki-ye Vosta

Film
 Khaki (2020 film), an Indian Kannada action film
 Khaki (upcoming film), an upcoming Indian Tamil-language action thriller film

Other
 Khaki University
 Adam Khaki, 14th-century Muslim saint
 Khaki trousers, which are normally khaki-colored chinos
 Khaki election
 Khaki drill

See also

 Khakee, a 2004 Indian film
 Kaakki, a 2007 Indian Malayalam film
 

 Kakhi, a surname
 Kaki (disambiguation)